Hess v. Indiana, 414 U.S. 105 (1973), was a United States Supreme Court case involving the First Amendment that reaffirmed and clarified the imminent lawless action test first articulated in Brandenburg v. Ohio (1969). Hess is still cited by courts to protect speech threatening future lawless action.

Background
The case involved an antiwar protest on the campus of Indiana University Bloomington. Between 100 and 150 protesters were in the streets. The sheriff and his deputies then proceeded to clear the streets of the protestors. As the sheriff was passing Gregory Hess, one of the members of the crowd, Hess uttered, "We'll take the fucking street later" or "We'll take the fucking street again." Hess was convicted in Indiana state court of disorderly conduct.

Decision
The Supreme Court reversed Hess's conviction because Hess' statement, at worst, "amounted to nothing more than advocacy of illegal action at some indefinite future time." In contrast to such an indefinite future time, the Court emphasized the word imminent in the "imminent lawless action" test of Brandenburg. Because the evidence did not show that Hess' speech was intended and likely to produce "imminent disorder", the state could not punish Hess' speech.

In addition, Hess' speech was not directed at any particular person or group. As a result, "it cannot be said that he was advocating, in the normal sense, any action." For similar reasons, Hess' speech also could not be considered "fighting words" under Chaplinsky v. New Hampshire (1942).

See also
Clear and present danger
List of United States Supreme Court cases, volume 414
Shouting fire in a crowded theater
Abrams v. United States, 
Chaplinsky v. New Hampshire, 
Dennis v. United States, 
Feiner v. New York, 
Kunz v. New York, 
Masses Publishing Co. v. Patten, 244 F. 535 (S.D.N.Y. 1917)
Schenck v. United States, 
Terminiello v. Chicago, 
Whitney v. California,

References

Further reading

External links
 
 Thomson Reuters blog post: TODAY IN 1973: SUPREME COURT EXPANDS FREE SPEECH IN HESS V. INDIANA

1973 in United States case law
Illegal speech in the United States
United States Free Speech Clause case law
United States Supreme Court cases
United States Supreme Court cases of the Burger Court